The 2008–09 Bowling Green Falcons men's ice hockey team represented Bowling Green State University in the 2008–09 NCAA Division I men's ice hockey season. Their regular season began on October 10, 2008, against RIT and concluded on February 28, 2009, against Western Michigan. Despite finishing last in the Central Collegiate Hockey Association, Bowling Green advanced to the 2009 CCHA Men's Ice Hockey Tournament where they were eliminated two games to none by Ohio State in the opening round.

Pre-season
In May 2008, assistant coach and former Falcon player, Doug Schueller, left the team to become the head coach of the ice hockey team at Saint John's (MN), becoming the 22nd head coach in the Johnnies' history. and was replaced by another former Falcons player and graduate assistant, Dennis Williams, in July.  Once again in August, the hockey team lost another assistant coach, when Todd Reirden took a position as assistant coach with the Wilkes-Barre/Scranton Penguins of the American Hockey League under former Bowling Green teammate Dan Bylsma and was replaced with Frank Novock who was an assistant with Wayne State University's ice hockey program before it was disbanded.

A month before the season, Paluch named senior defenseman Tim Maxwell and junior defenseman Kyle Page as co-captains for the upcoming season.  At the CCHA media day, the Falcons were voted to finish ninth by the league's coaches with 56 points and seventh by the league's media partners with 444 points.  Also at the media day, sophomore forward Jacob Cepis was named an honorable mention to the preseason all-conference team.  The Falcons entered the season returning 21 letter winners, while losing six including Buffalo Sabres prospect, Derek Whitmore who scored 102 points during his four-year career with Bowling Green.

Recruiting

Standings

Schedule and results
  Green background indicates shootout/overtime win (conference only) or win (2 points).
  Red background indicates regulation loss (0 points).
  White background indicates overtime/shootout loss (conference only) or tie (1 point).

Player statistics

Skaters
Note: GP = Games played; G = Goals; A = Assists; Pts = Points; +/- = Plus/minus; PIM = Penalty minutes

Goaltenders
Note: GP = Games played; TOI = Time on ice; W = Wins; L = Losses; T = Ties; GA = Goals against; SO = Shutouts; SV% = Save percentage; GAA = Goals against average; G = Goals; A = Assists; PIM = Penalty minutes

References
General

 Schedule and results: 
 Player statistics: 

Specific

External links
 Bowling Green Falcons men's ice hockey 

Bowling Green
Bowling Green Falcons men's ice hockey seasons
B
2008 in sports in Ohio
2009 in sports in Ohio